Simon Epstein (born in 1947 in Paris) is an Israeli economist and historian.

Career
Epstein obtained a doctorate degree in political science at Pantheon-Sorbonne University. He moved to Jerusalem in 1974 and worked as an economist for the Israeli Ministry of Finance.

Since 1982, his main research areas have been antisemitism and racism.

Published works 
 L'Antisémitisme français aujourd'hui et demain, Belfond, 1984
 Cry of Cassandra: the resurgence of European anti-semitism, National Press, A Zenith, 1985
 Les Chemises jaunes : chronique d'une extrême-droite raciste en Israël, Calmann-Lévy, Histoire contemporaine, 1990
 Les institutions israélites françaises de 1919 à 1939 : solidarité juive et lutte contre l'antisémitisme, Paris 1, 1990
 Les institutions israélites françaises de 1929 à 1939 : solidarité juive et lutte contre l'antisémitisme, Lille 3 University, ANRT, 1990
 Cyclical patterns in antisemitism: the dynamics of anti-Jewish violence in western countries since the 1950s, Analysis of current trends in antisemitism/ACTA, No. 2, Hebrew University of Jerusalem, Vidal Sassoon International Center for the Study of Antisemitism, 1993
 Histoire du peuple juif au XXe siècle : de 1914 à nos jours, Paris, Hachette Littératures, 1982, series Pluriel, No. 993, 2000
 Les Dreyfusards sous l'Occupation, Albin Michel, series Bibliothèque Albin Michel de l'histoire, 2001
 Storia del popolo ebraico, Seam, 2001
 
 1930, une année dans l'histoire du peuple juif, Stock, 2012

References 

Israeli economists
Israeli historians
Israeli essayists
Scholars of antisemitism
Historians of World War II
Political historians
Historians of Vichy France
Pantheon-Sorbonne University alumni
Academic staff of the Hebrew University of Jerusalem
1947 births
Living people
Writers from Paris
20th-century French Jews
French emigrants to Israel